Bridgham is a village and civil parish in the English county of Norfolk.
For the purposes of local government, it falls within the district of Breckland.

History
Bridgham's name derives from the Old English for a village or farmstead with a bridge.

In the Domesday Book, Bridgham is recorded as consisting of 11 households and being owned by St. Etheldreda's Abbey, Ely.

References

External links

Villages in Norfolk
Civil parishes in Norfolk
Breckland District